Thomas Müller (born 13 September 1989) is a German professional footballer who plays for  club Bayern Munich and the Germany national team. A versatile player, Müller has been deployed in a variety of attacking roles – as an attacking midfielder, second striker, centre forward, and on either wing. Müller has been praised for his positioning, teamwork, stamina, and work-rate, and has shown consistency in both scoring and creating goals. He is regarded as one of the best off-the-ball players of all time due to his positional awareness. Müller holds the record for the most assists given in the Bundesliga, with 159 (as of 4 March 2023).

A product of Bayern's youth system, Müller has represented the club ever since. With Bayern he has won a record eleven Bundesliga titles, six DFB-Pokals, eight DFL-Supercups, two UEFA Champions League titles, two UEFA Super Cups and two FIFA Club World Cups. He made his first-team breakthrough in the 2009–10 season after Louis van Gaal was appointed as the main coach; he played almost every game as the club won the league and cup double and reached the Champions League final. Müller scored 23 goals in the 2012–13 season as Bayern won a historic treble; the league title, cup and Champions League. He broke the Bundesliga record for assists by providing 21 in a season (a record in the top five leagues jointly held with Lionel Messi in La Liga) and scored 14 goals as Bayern won a second treble in the 2019–20 season.

Müller earned a call-up to the German national team in 2010. At the 2010 World Cup, he scored five goals in six appearances as Germany finished in third place. He was named the Best Young Player of the tournament and won the Golden Boot as the tournament's top scorer, with five goals and three assists. At the 2014 World Cup he played a major role in helping the team win the trophy, scoring five goals and receiving the Silver Ball as the tournament's second-top player and the Silver Boot as the second-top goalscorer, and was also named in the World Cup All-Star XI and in the Dream Team. On 21 December 2014, Müller was ranked the fifth-best footballer in the world by The Guardian. Müller is the most decorated German footballer in history, with 32 trophies.

Club career

Early career
Müller played as a youth for TSV Pähl, and at the age of 10 he made the  journey to join local Bundesliga side Bayern Munich in 2000. He progressed through the youth system and was part of the team that finished runner-up in the Under 19 Bundesliga in 2007.

Bayern Munich
He made his debut for the reserve team in March 2008 when he replaced Stephan Fürstner in a Regionalliga match against SpVgg Unterhaching, in which he scored. He made two more Regionalliga appearances in the 2007–08 season, while continuing to play for the under-19 team. The following season, Bayern's second string qualified for the newly formed 3. Liga, and Müller established himself as a key player – he played in 32 out of 38 matches and scored 15 times to make him the league's fifth top scorer.

2008–09 season
Müller became involved in the first-team under then manager Jürgen Klinsmann; he appeared in pre-season friendlies, and made his full debut on 15 August 2008, when he came on as a substitute for Miroslav Klose for the last ten minutes of a Bundesliga match against Hamburger SV. Despite Müller feeling that his performance did not go well, he made three more Bundesliga appearances that season and made his Champions League debut on 10 March 2009 when he was substituted on in the 72nd minute for Bastian Schweinsteiger in a 7–1 win over Sporting CP. He scored Bayern's last goal as they won the tie 12–1 on aggregate.

In February 2009, Müller signed his first contract for the senior team, a two-year deal effective from the 2009–10 season, along with reserve teammate Holger Badstuber.

2009–10 season

Müller was prepared to be loaned or even transferred away to find first-team football, but when Louis van Gaal was appointed manager, both Müller and Badstuber became fixtures in the Bayern first team from the start of the season. In the first few matches, Müller was a regular substitute, and on 12 September 2009, he was brought on against Borussia Dortmund and scored two goals in a 5–1 victory. Three days later, he scored another brace in a 3–0 Champions League victory over Maccabi Haifa. He rounded off September by being named the Bundesliga Player of the Month and earned praise from his namesake, legendary former Bayern and Germany striker Gerd Müller. After the Haifa match, Müller was in the starting XI for almost every match, only missing one match, a Champions League match against Bordeaux, for which he was suspended, because he was sent off in an earlier match against the same team.

In February 2010, Müller signed a new contract with Bayern Munich through 2013. During the second half of the season, Müller continued to be a regular first-team starter, usually playing in a central striking role due to the availability of other wide players Franck Ribéry and Arjen Robben. In April 2010, he scored the second goal in a 2–1 win against title rivals Schalke 04, and in the penultimate league match of the season, he scored the first hat-trick of his career, in a 3–1 win over VfL Bochum which effectively secured the German title for Bayern. The title was confirmed a week later with a 3–1 win at Hertha BSC, a match which Müller started.

For the season, he played in all 34 Bundesliga matches, starting 29, and recorded 13 goals and 11 assists. Bayern and Müller were back in Berlin the following week, to face Werder Bremen in the final of the DFB-Pokal. Müller started the match and Bayern won 4–0 to complete the domestic double. Müller scored four goals and made two assists during the competition, which made him its leading scorer for the season. Bayern's season ended in pursuit of a first treble, in the 2010 Champions League Final against Inter Milan at Santiago Bernabéu Stadium in Madrid. It was not to be, however, as they lost 2–0, with both goals coming from Diego Milito. Müller was in the starting line-up and had a key chance just after half-time, with Bayern 1–0 down, but his shot was saved by Júlio César. Müller felt particularly disappointed by this defeat, but he ended his first season as a first-team player with 52 matches played and 19 goals in all competitions.

In a poll conducted by the sports magazine kicker, he was voted by his fellow professionals as the best newcomer of the 2009–10 season and was named in the Bundesliga Team of the Season. Müller credits Van Gaal for having had the biggest part to play in his rise to success – the coach arrived with a reputation for promoting youth team players, particularly at Ajax, and consistently gave Müller his chance in the first-team, going as far to say "Müller spielt bei mir immer" ("with me, Müller will always play"). Müller, in return, described Van Gaal as "a genius technician" who makes players "improve every time".

2010–11 season

Müller returned from his post-World Cup break to sign another contract extension, this time extending his stay at Bayern until 2015. As with all of Bayern's World Cup participants, he missed much of pre-season, and his first match back was the Supercup against Schalke 04 on 7 August. He was named in the starting 11, and scored the opening goal in a 2–0 win. Two weeks later he scored the opening goal of Bayern's league season in a 2–1 home win against VfL Wolfsburg.

Müller played in every match of the first half of the season, usually as a starter, but as the team struggled for results, Müller was unable to match the previous season's goalscoring exploits, being dropped to the bench, and even receiving a telling off from Louis van Gaal after missing an easy chance in a 2–0 defeat against 1. FC Kaiserslautern in August. He was philosophical about this dip in form, though, and after eight league games without a goal, he scored in a 4–1 win against Eintracht Frankfurt on 27 November; He followed that by scoring in consecutive league and cup wins against VfB Stuttgart three weeks later. These goals took his tally to eight goals in all competitions and included a spectacular goal to open the scoring in a 2–0 Champions League victory against Roma on 15 September.

As his team was on its winter break, Müller was left to reflect on what he described as "an almost unbelievable first year as a pro". Müller began the second half of the season in good form, but was involved in an altercation with teammate Arjen Robben, who was angered when Müller showed his displeasure at a poor free-kick Robben took during a 3–1 win at Werder Bremen. Müller again played in every game of the season and scored 19 goals (12 in the league), but the season was less successful for Bayern, as they finished third in the league, and were knocked out of the DFB-Pokal in the semi-finals by Schalke 04 and in the round of 16 of the UEFA Champions League by Inter Milan; Bayern had won 1–0 at the San Siro, and Müller scored 31 minutes into the second leg to make it 3–1 on aggregate, but Inter levelled the score at 3–3 in the 88th minute to go through on the away goals rule. Müller's mentor Van Gaal was increasingly criticised for inflexibility in tactical, transfer and selection policy, and ultimately lost his job, being replaced with Jupp Heynckes.

2011–12 season

In Bayern's first DFB-Pokal game Müller was awarded the man of the match after earning two penalties which were converted by Mario Gómez and Bastian Schweinsteiger, Müller then added a third in the closing stages to secure a 3–0 victory over Eintracht Braunschweig. It took Müller five matches for him to get his first league goal; he scored it against Schalke 04 in Bayern's 2–0 win. Müller then scored in Bayern's next home game in the early stages of the match, which they went on to win, 3–0. On 26 November 2011, Müller netted the opener on the half-hour in Bayern's 6–0 thrashing of FC Ingolstadt, giving him his second DFB-Pokal goal. Müller was on the short-list of this year's FIFA Ballon d'Or award. On 10 and 15 January, in Bayern's warm up friendlies, Müller scored three goals in two games, a brace against the India national team (which Bayern then went on to win 4–0) and one goal in Bayern's other 4–0 victory over Rot-Weiß Erfurt. Müller provided two assists in Bayern's win over VfB Stuttgart in the DFB-Pokal.

On 11 February, Bayern played 1. FC Kaiserslautern and Müller ended a goal drought lasting since 24 September 2011 with a header in their 2–0 victory. On 31 March 2012, Müller played his 100th Bundesliga game against 1. FC Nürnberg. On 19 May 2012, Müller scored the opening goal in the 83rd minute of the Champions League final against Chelsea with a powerful header, before being substituted for defender Daniel Van Buyten moments later. Bayern, however, then conceded a late equaliser, and would go on to lose the final on penalties. Müller stated post match how dissatisfied he was about the amount of time he had spent on the bench recently, although also expressed his desire to stay at Bayern in spite of this. During the season, Müller had scored seven goals in 34 league matches, two goals in five German Cup matches, and two goals in 14 Champions League matches.

2012–13 season

Müller's first Bundesliga goal of the season came over 2. Bundesliga champions SpVgg Greuther Fürth in Bayern's 3–0 victory on 27 August 2012. On 2 September, he netted a brace as Bayern thrashed southern rivals VfB Stuttgart, 6–1, in front of 71,000 at the newly expanded Allianz Arena. Müller helped Bayern achieve a record-breaking start to the league season, when he netted a brace over newly promoted Fortuna Düsseldorf on 20 October in their 5–0 victory, recording Bayern's eighth successive win. Three days later, he scored his first Champions League goal of the season, netting from the penalty spot, as Bayern defeated Lille 1–0 at the French side's newly built Grand Stade Lille Métropole.

On 13 December, after his good run of form in the first half of the Bundesliga season, Müller pledged his allegiance claiming he was at home in Munich and that, "There is no club to step up from when you leave FC Bayern... there almost is no better club." Six days later, he signed a two-year contract extension, keeping him at the Allianz Arena until 2017. At the winter break in the Bundesliga, he had nine goals and seven assists in 16 league appearances and a further three goals in the Champions League; this gave him a total of 13 goals halfway through the season, including his strike against Borussia Dortmund in Bayern's win in the 2012 DFL-Supercup. Müller scored his first goal in Bayern's second game back from the break in a 2–0 away win over VfB Stuttgart. Müller tapped in his fifth goal of the Champions League campaign on 2 April, completing a 2–0 first leg defeat of Juventus in the quarter-finals, ending the Italian club's 18-match unbeaten record in Europe.

On 23 April 2013, Müller scored two goals and gave an assist in a 4–0 win against Barcelona in the first leg of the Champions League semi-finals at the Allianz Arena. In the return fixture, Müller scored a header as Bayern won 3–0 to hand Barcelona their biggest ever aggregate defeat in the Champions League, with a 7–0 scoreline across the two matches. Müller then went on to play an important role in Bayern's 2–1 victory over Borussia Dortmund in the final. On 1 June, Müller scored a penalty in the final of the 2012–13 DFB-Pokal. Bayern won the cup 3–2 to complete an historic treble. Müller scored 23 goals overall in the season (including all competitions), netting 13 in the Bundesliga, one in the Pokal, and an impressive eight in the Champions League, he also added one in the 2012 DFL-Supercup which Bayern won 2–1.

2013–14 season

Müller began the 2013–14 season under new manager Pep Guardiola by playing in the German Super Cup. On 5 August, Müller scored a hat-trick as Bayern won 5–0 in the team's 2013–14 DFB-Pokal first-round game against Schwarz-Weiß Rehden. In Bayern's opening 2013–14 Bundesliga fixture, Müller missed a penalty for the first time. Seconds later, the save from the penalty flicked the hand of Álvaro Domínguez which resulted in another penalty which David Alaba converted. After this, Müller stated, "I am still happy to take penalties, but I think David Alaba is the main man for spot kicks for now." He played in the UEFA Super Cup.

On 25 September, against Hannover 96 in the second round of the DFB-Pokal, Müller scored twice taking his cup tally to five goals in just two games. On 28 September, Müller scored the only goal in a 1–0 victory over VfL Wolfsburg, giving him his first goal in the 2013–14 Bundesliga. Müller scored his first 2013–14 UEFA Champions League goal of the campaign and Bayern defeated Manchester City 3–1 at the City of Manchester Stadium on 2 October. He played in a match at the FIFA Club World Cup.

On 17 May 2014, Müller scored Bayern's second goal in a 2–0 extra-time defeat of Borussia Dortmund in the 2014 DFB-Pokal Final, giving die Roten the tenth league and cup double in their history. Müller finished as the tournament's top scorer with eight goals in five appearances. He finished the season by scoring 13 goals in 31 league matches, eight goals in five DFB-Pokal matches, and five goals in 12 Champions League matches.

2014–15 season

After the 2013–14 season, Müller signed a new contract keeping him at Bayern until 2019 and rejected a contract offer from Manchester United. Müller played in the DFL-Supercup, which was Bayern's first match in the 2014–15 season. Bayern lost the match 2–0. His first goal of the season was against Preußen Münster in the DFB-Pokal on 17 August 2014. Then in the opening match of the Bundesliga, on 22 August 2014, Müller scored the opening goal of Bayern's Bundesliga season against VfL Wolfsburg. Bayern went on to win the match 2–1.

On 11 March 2015, Müller scored two goals against Shakhtar Donetsk in a 7–0 win to draw level with former teammate Mario Gómez as the top-scoring German player in UEFA Champions League history. He subsequently became the leader when he scored in a 6–1 win against Porto on 21 April 2015. He finished the season with 13 goals in 32 league matches, a goal in five DFB-Pokal matches, and seven goals in ten Champions League matches.

2015–16 season

Müller started the season by playing in the DFL-Supercup against VfL Wolfsburg. He started the league season with two goals against Hamburger SV, a goal against 1899 Hoffenheim, two goals against Bayer Leverkusen, and a goal against FC Augsburg in the first four matchdays. He had scored from the penalty spot against Bayer Leverkusen and Augsburg. He failed to score in his next three Bundesliga matches. He failed to convert a penalty shot against Mainz 05 on matchday seven. His next Bundesliga goal came when he scored two goals against Borussia Dortmund on matchday eight. One of the goals was scored from the penalty spot. His goalscoring continued in other competitions. He scored two goals against Wolfsburg in the second round of the DFB-Pokal, and in Champions League, two goals against Olympiacos, two goals against Arsenal, and a goal in the return leg against Olympiacos. In scoring in the home win over Olympiacos, Müller became the youngest player to win 50 UEFA Champions League games, beating the record of Lionel Messi by 14 months.

On 9 December 2015, Müller came on as a 46th-minute substitute for Franck Ribéry in a 2–0 win against Dinamo Zagreb. He failed to convert his penalty shot in the match and finished the group stage with five goals from six appearances. On 18 December 2015, Müller signed a new contract with Bayern, keeping him at the club until 2021. On 19 December 2015, Bayern defeated Hannover 96 1–0 with a goal from the penalty mark from Müller. Bayern went on winter break after the match. Müller finished the first half of the league with 14 goals from 17 appearances. This includes scoring five goals from the penalty mark in six opportunities. He had scored 21 goals in 25 appearances in all competitions up until the winter break.

On 12 March 2016, Müller scored a brace in a 5–0 victory over Werder Bremen. Four days later, with Bayern trailing Juventus 1–2 in the second leg of the Champions League round of 16, he scored a 91st-minute equaliser before Bayern won in extra time 4–2 (6–4 aggregate). On 19 April 2016, Müller scored both goals in Bayern's 2–0 defeat of Werder Bremen in the DFB-Pokal semi-final. His first goal of the match was his 150th for the club in all competitions. On 3 May 2016, Müller had a penalty kick saved by Jan Oblak in the Champions League semi-final second leg at home to Atlético Madrid. The match ended in a 2–1 win for Bayern but the team was knocked out on the away goals rule. He finished the season by scoring 20 goals in 31 league matches, 4 goals in 5 German Cup matches, and 8 goals in 12 Champions League matches. He didn't score in the German Super Cup. With 32 goals in all Competitions,  this was Müller's most prolific season to date.

2016–17 season

Müller started the season by winning and scoring in the 2016 German Super Cup against Borussia Dortmund on 14 August 2016. In the league, Müller did not score for 999 minutes until he scored during a home game against VfL Wolfsburg in the 76th minute. He finished the 2016–17 season by scoring five goals in 29 Bundesliga appearances, no goals in three German Cup appearances, and three goals in nine Champions League appearances. Müller also provided 12 assists in the Bundesliga.

Several German football experts like Lothar Matthäus blamed manager Carlo Ancelotti for Müller's struggles in front of the goal. Ancelotti often preferred Thiago Alcântara as the player playing behind the striker, Müller's prime position. Müller was often benched for the important matches in Europe and in the Bundesliga.

2017–18 season

Müller started the 2017–18 season by playing in the 2017 German Super Cup. He played in the opening 67 minutes before being replaced by Kingsley Coman. His first goal of the season was against Mainz on matchday four of the Bundesliga. On 21 January 2018, he scored two goals against Werder Bremen in the Bundesliga, with his second goal in the match being his 100th in the competition.

On 20 February 2018, Müller scored two goals against Beşiktaş in the first leg of the Champions League round of 16. On 17 April 2018, Müller scored a hat-trick in Bayern's 6–2 defeat of Bayer Leverkusen in the DFB-Pokal semi-final. Overall, Müller scored eight goals and provided 14 assists in 29 league matches. He finished the season with 15 goals in 45 matches in all Competitions.

2018–19 season

Müller started the 2018–19 season by starting in the German Super Cup. Müller scored in the first two matchdays in the Bundesliga season. He scored in the second round of the German Cup against SV Rödinghausen. He scored two goals against Fortuna Düsseldorf in the Bundesliga on 24 November 2018. On 12 December 2018, Müller played his 105th Champions League match in a match against Ajax and therefore leveling former club legend Philipp Lahm as the record appearance holder in the Champions League at Bayern. In that same match, Müller was sent off for the first time in his career for a straight red card. This resulted in a two-match suspension. On 15 December 2018, Müller made his 300th Bundesliga appearance for Bayern against Hannover 96.

On 18 May 2019, Müller won his seventh consecutive Bundesliga title as Bayern finished two points above Dortmund with 78 points. It was Müller's eighth Bundesliga title. A week later, Müller won his fifth DFB-Pokal as Bayern defeated RB Leipzig 3–0 in the 2019 DFB-Pokal Final. He finished the season with 9 goals in 45 matches in all competitions.

2019–20 season

On 2 November 2019, Müller made his 500th competitive appearance for Bayern, becoming the 10th Bayern player to reach this mark since the club's promotion to the Bundesliga in 1965. The following month, he became the first-ever player to register 11 assists in the first half of a Bundesliga season, achieving the new record in his side's 2–0 win over Wolfsburg. On 7 April 2020, Müller pegged a contract extension keeping him at Bayern until 2023. He recorded his 20th assist of the Bundesliga season in an away match against Bayer Leverkusen on matchday 30, breaking the record for most assists in a season, previously held by Kevin De Bruyne and Emil Forsberg. He provided another assist in an away match against Wolfsburg on Matchday 34, to finish off the season with a record of 21 assists.

On 14 August, Müller scored a brace and assisted another in the 2019–20 UEFA Champions League quarter-final match against Barcelona, which ended in an 8–2 win. Later on, Bayern won 1–0 over Paris Saint-Germain in the final, which marked the club's sixth Champions League title and Müller's second Champions League title. He finished the season by scoring 8 goals in 33 league matches, two goals in six German Cup matches, and 4 goals in 10 Champions League matches.

2020–21 season

On 18 September 2020, Müller scored his first goal of the season, and provided one assist, in an 8–0 win over Schalke 04. He later managed to win the UEFA Super Cup and DFL-Supercup to be his 27th trophy of his club career; hence, he became the most decorated player in German history, breaking the previous record of 26 trophies won by his former Bayern teammate Bastian Schweinsteiger. On 11 February 2021, he tested positive for COVID-19 and went into quarantine; hence, could not play in the 2020 FIFA Club World Cup Final. However, Bayern went on to win the final 1–0 against Mexican side Tigres UANL.

Müller won his ninth consecutive Bundesliga title as Bayern finished the league in first place with 78 points, 13 points ahead of second-placed Borussia Dortmund. It was Müller's 10th Bundesliga title. He finished the season by scoring 15 goals in 46 matches in all Competitions.

2021–22 season

On 17 August 2021, Müller scored his first goal of the season, and provided one assist, in a 3–1 away win against Borussia Dortmund in the 2021 DFL-Supercup. On 19 November, Müller made his 600th appearance for Bayern in a 2–1 loss to Augsburg, becoming the fourth overall appearance maker behind Sepp Maier, Gerd Müller and Oliver Kahn. On 8 December, Müller scored his 50th goal in the UEFA Champions League against Barcelona in a 3–0 win, becoming only the 8th player in the competition's history to do so. Müller played his 400th match in the Bundesliga on 17 December, scored one goal and assisted another in a 4–0 win over Wolfsburg.

On 23 April, following a 3–1 win against Dortmund in Der Klassiker, Bayern won their 10th consecutive Bundesliga title, in the process, making Müller the player with the most Bundesliga title wins in history with 11. On 3 May, Müller extended his contract with Bayern, keeping him at the club until the end of the 2023–24 season.

International career

Müller represented Germany at various youth levels, starting with the under-16s in 2004. In August 2009, he was called up to the under-21 team for his debut in a 3–1 friendly defeat against Turkey. He earned six caps for the under-21s and scored one goal, the eighth in an 11–0 thrashing of San Marino.

In October of the same year, Müller's regular appearances for Bayern's first team caused Germany national team manager Joachim Löw to publicly consider him for a call-up, despite initial reluctance from the Bayern Munich board; the following month, Müller was named in the squad for a friendly against the Ivory Coast. However, this coincided with the death of national team goalkeeper Robert Enke, which led to the cancellation of a match against Chile the same week. With less opportunity to try out new players, and with the under-21 team facing crucial qualifiers for the 2011 European Championship, Löw and under-21 manager Rainer Adrion felt that Müller was needed at the under-21 level, and Müller was called back into the under-21s.

He was back in the senior squad for its next get-together, a training session in Sindelfingen in January 2010, and was named in the squad for the following match, a friendly against Argentina in March. He made his debut in this game in the starting XI at the Allianz Arena, his home stadium with Bayern. He was substituted in the 66th minute for fellow debutant Toni Kroos as Germany lost 1–0.

2010 World Cup
Müller was named in Germany's provisional 27-man squad for the 2010 FIFA World Cup along with seven other Bayern Munich players. Despite suffering a scare when he fell off his bicycle at the team's training camp in South Tyrol, Müller only received superficial injuries and made the final cut for the tournament when the squad was reduced to 23 players. He was allocated the number 13, normally worn by injured captain Michael Ballack, and previously worn by Müller's eponym Gerd Müller. He earned his second international cap in the final warm-up match before the World Cup when he came on as a half-time substitute for Piotr Trochowski in a 3–1 win over Bosnia and Herzegovina. He started the first game of Germany's World Cup campaign and scored the third goal – his first internationally – in a 4–0 win over Australia, winning Germany's goal of the month award in the process. He played in all Germany's group games, as they finished top of Group D; he scored twice and assisted once in the 4–1 victory over England in the round of 16. In the third minute of Germany's 4–0 quarter-final win against Argentina, he opened the scoring with his fourth tournament goal. However, he picked up his second booking of the tournament in the first half, for a handball and was suspended for the semi-final defeat against Spain. Müller said that he felt far more nervous during the Spain game than any he was able to play. He returned to the team for the third-place playoff against Uruguay and scored the first goal, his fifth of the tournament, as Germany won 3–2 to take the bronze medals. The team's success was a culmination of a series of changes made after the national team's failure at Euro 2000. The Germans emphasized a more open, attack-minded style not previously associated with Germany, and included prominent young players, including Müller, Sami Khedira and Mesut Özil.

With five goals Müller ended as joint top goalscorer of the tournament. He earned the Golden Boot with these goals and his three assists. He also won the Best Young Player Award over fellow nominees André Ayew of Ghana and Giovani dos Santos of Mexico. For both awards, he succeeded a German teammate, Miroslav Klose and Lukas Podolski, respectively, from 2006.

In October 2010, he was named on the shortlist for the FIFA Ballon d'Or award along with four of his Germany teammates. Reflecting on his World Cup success, Müller said "I basically got lucky, I hit form at just the right time".

Euro 2012
Müller started all ten of Germany's qualifiers for Euro 2012, as the team qualified for the finals with a 100% record. Müller provided assists for seven goals, three of which came in a 6–2 win over Austria in September 2011 which secured Germany's qualification for the finals with two games to spare. He scored three times in the campaign, two goals coming in a 4–0 win over Kazakhstan in March 2011, the third in a 3–1 win over Turkey in October of the same year.

Müller was included in Joachim Löw's squad for Euro 2012,  where the Germans were knocked out in the semi-finals by Italy.

2014 World Cup

Müller scored his first World Cup qualifying goals on 22 March 2013, getting Germany's opener and final goal in a 3–0 away win over Kazakhstan. He also scored in the 3–0 victories over Austria and the Faroe Islands to give him four goals in Germany's successful qualification campaign.

On 16 June 2014, in Germany's opening match of the 2014 World Cup, Müller scored the first hat-trick of the tournament and was named man of the match in a 4–0 win against Portugal. In addition, he was also the target of Pepe's headbutt in the 37th minute, which resulted in the Portuguese defender being sent off. He denied that he had "overplayed" the situation leading to the red card. On 26 June, Müller scored the only goal of the final group match against the United States to help the Germans win Group G and dispelled fear of collusion between German coach Joachim Löw and American coach Jürgen Klinsmann to play to a result that benefited both Germany and the US as had occurred in 1982.

On 8 July, Müller scored Germany's opening goal in their 7–1 semi-final defeat of Brazil. This was Germany's 2,000th goal in its history, and put Müller level with Helmut Rahn's tally of ten World Cup goals. Müller also became only the third player to score at least five goals in each of his first two World Cups (after Teófilo Cubillas and teammate Miroslav Klose).

On 11 July, Müller was named on the ten-man shortlist for FIFA's Golden Ball award for the tournament's best player. After playing all 120 minutes of Germany's final 1–0 victory against Argentina, Müller received the Silver Boot as the tournament's second-top goalscorer with five goals, and was also named in the World Cup All-Star XI, having played a major role in his team's World Cup triumph.

Euro 2016
Müller featured in nine of ten matches during Germany's qualifying campaign for UEFA Euro 2016, scoring nine goals as Germany topped their qualifying group to qualify for Euro 2016.

Müller started in all six matches that Germany played at the Euro 2016 finals. In their quarter-final match against Italy, Müller's shot was the first one to be saved in the penalty shoot-out during the tournament. This was also the first time Germany failed to score in a shoot-out since Uli Stielike missed in the 1982 World Cup. Germany would still end up winning the shoot-out 6–5, however. Müller's poor run of form throughout the tournament hindered Germany's chances, and they would be eliminated by hosts France in the semi-finals. Müller exited the competition without adding a goal to his name at the European Championship.

2018 World Cup
Müller was selected in Germany's final 23-man squad by manager Joachim Löw for the 2018 FIFA World Cup. Müller played in all three matches for Germany against Mexico, Sweden and South Korea. Müller started against Mexico and Sweden, but came on as a substitute against South Korea. Müller did not manage to score a goal as Germany crashed out of the World Cup at the group stage for the first time since 1938.

Exclusion from national team
On 5 March 2019, national team coach Joachim Löw confirmed that he would plan without Müller for the foreseeable future, along with his club teammates Jérôme Boateng and Mats Hummels. Müller said after the decision that he was "angry and surprised" why Löw decided to drop him and his Bayern teammates. However, after Löw later admitted in March 2021 that he was considering reversing his decision and allowing the previously barred players to partake in the upcoming UEFA Euro 2020, Müller insisted he was "definitely ready" to return to international duty, stating his desire to win another title with Germany.

Return to the team and Euro 2020
On 19 May 2021, Müller, along with Hummels, was included in Germany's final 26-man squad for the UEFA Euro 2020, ending a period of over two years of exclusion from the national team. In the Euro 2020 round of 16, Müller missed a one-on-one chance against England when the score was 1–0 for the latter; however, England went on eventually to beat Germany 2–0. Hence, Müller played 15 matches in the European Championship without scoring any goals.

2022 World Cup
In November 2022, he was selected in the final squad for the 2022 FIFA World Cup in Qatar. Müller played in all three matches for Germany against Japan, Spain and Costa Rica, but failed to find the net as Germany were eliminated in the group stage for the second time in a row.

Style of play
Müller's role can be described as an attacking all-rounder, a versatile player who is able to play in a variety of offensive positions. As he came through the youth system, he was seen primarily as a midfielder, but since breaking into the first-team he has been used in more attacking roles. Bayern Munich usually plays a 4–2–3–1 formation, and Müller is most often part of the three attacking midfielders behind the central striker. He can play in any of the attacking midfield roles but usually plays in the centre for Bayern, but has also played on the right wing, especially for Germany. He has been used in a central attacking role as an out-and-out striker on occasion, or even as a second striker.

Although he lacks physical strength, Müller has been praised for his maturity, technique, awareness, tactical intelligence, and positioning. He has been particularly noted for his composure; former Germany manager Joachim Löw said he is "impervious to pressure" and former Bayern manager Louis van Gaal said he has tremendous mental strength. A consistent scorer and creator of goals, Müller has been lauded in the media for his intelligent movement off the ball and ability to time his attacking runs; he describes himself as a player who can find gaps in the opposition defence but not particularly good at dribbling or one-on-ones. Müller describes this role as Raumdeuter, a term which translates, literally, to "space interpreter" ( Traumdeuter, "dream interpreter"). During the 2014 World Cup, Germany manager Joachim Löw stated that Müller "is a very unorthodox player and you can't really predict his lines of running, but he has one aim and that is 'how can I score a goal?'". In addition to his offensive capabilities, Müller has also been praised by pundits for his teamwork, stamina, and defensive work-rate. Former Bayern assistant coach Hermann Gerland gave him the nickname Radio Müller for his loud and frequent comments on the pitch and in the dressing room.

Personal life
Müller was born in Weilheim in Oberbayern, Bavaria. He grew up in the nearby village of Pähl, which became the centre of media attention during his World Cup exploits. His parents are Klaudia and Gerhard, and he has a brother, Simon, who is two and a half years younger.

Müller married his long-time girlfriend Lisa Trede, a semi-professional equestrian who works on a farm, in December 2009 after being engaged for two years. In June 2011, he became an ambassador for YoungWings, a charity that helps children who have suffered bereavement or trauma.

Career statistics

Club

International

As of match played 14 June 2022. Scores and results list Germany's goal tally first.

Notes

Honours
Bayern Munich
Bundesliga: 2009–10, 2012–13, 2013–14, 2014–15, 2015–16, 2016–17, 2017–18, 2018–19, 2019–20, 2020–21, 2021–22
DFB-Pokal: 2009–10, 2012–13, 2013–14, 2015–16, 2018–19, 2019–20
DFL-Supercup: 2010, 2012, 2016, 2017, 2018, 2020, 2021, 2022
UEFA Champions League: 2012–13, 2019–20
UEFA Super Cup: 2013, 2020
FIFA Club World Cup: 2013, 2020
Germany
FIFA World Cup: 2014; third place: 2010
Individual
FIFA World Cup Golden Boot: 2010
FIFA World Cup Best Young Player: 2010
FIFA World Cup All-Star Team: 2010
FIFA World Cup Silver Boot: 2014
FIFA World Cup Silver Ball: 2014
FIFA World Cup All-Star Team: 2014
FIFA World Cup Dream Team: 2014
World Soccer Young Player of the Year: 2010
Bravo Award: 2010
VDV Bundesliga Newcomer of the Season: 2010 
 DFB-Pokal Top Scorer: 2010, 2014
Bavarian Order of Merit: 2019
UEFA Super Cup Man of the Match: 2020
UEFA Champions League Squad of the Season: 2019–20
Bundesliga Team of the Season: 2017–18, 2019–20, 2020–21
Bundesliga Player of the Month: January 2022
VDV Bundesliga Team of the Season: 2009–10, 2015–16, 2017–18, 2020–21
kicker Bundesliga Team of the Season: 2012–13, 2015–16, 2019–20, 2020–21
 Bayern Munich Player of the Season: 2021–22

See also 
 List of footballers with 100 or more UEFA Champions League appearances
 List of men's footballers with 100 or more international caps
 List of one-club men in association football

References

External links

 
Profile at the FC Bayern Munich website

1989 births
Living people
People from Weilheim-Schongau
Sportspeople from Upper Bavaria
Footballers from Bavaria
German footballers
Germany youth international footballers
Germany under-21 international footballers
Germany international footballers
Association football midfielders
Association football forwards
Association football utility players
FC Bayern Munich II players
FC Bayern Munich footballers
Regionalliga players
3. Liga players
Bundesliga players
UEFA Champions League winning players
2010 FIFA World Cup players
UEFA Euro 2012 players
2014 FIFA World Cup players
UEFA Euro 2016 players
2018 FIFA World Cup players
UEFA Euro 2020 players
2022 FIFA World Cup players
FIFA World Cup-winning players
FIFA Century Club